Glen Turner (born 22 February 1979 in New Zealand) is a former professional rugby league footballer who played for the Melbourne Storm and Canberra Raiders. He played as a second row or lock. He also played for the Harman Demons cricket club. Playing 66 games has scored 2382 runs, a talented batsmen who has averaged 45 and has best bowling of 5/19.

Playing career
Turner is from the Canterbury Rugby League and was a Junior Kiwi in 1998. He played for the Linwood club.

Turner played for the Melbourne Storm between 2000 and 2006 before moving to the Canberra Raiders where he stayed until 2009. In December 2009 he confirmed that he was retiring from professional rugby league.

Since retirement he has served as the Raiders Welfare Officer.

References

1979 births
Living people
Canberra Raiders players
Junior Kiwis players
Melbourne Storm players
New Zealand rugby league players
Norths Devils players
Riccarton Knights players
Rugby league second-rows
Rugby league locks
Rugby league players from Christchurch